The 1939 Arkansas State Indians football team represented Arkansas State College—now known as Arkansas State University—as a member of the Arkansas Intercollegiate Conference during the 1939 college football season. Led by first-year head coach Bill Adams, the Indians compiled an overall record of 4–3 with a mark of 0–1 in conference play.

Schedule

References

Arkansas State
Arkansas State Red Wolves football seasons
Arkansas State Indians football